Norway women's national bandy team represents Norway in all international play and the team has participated in all World Championships for women since the inaugural tournament in 2004. As of 2018, the team has won five bronze medals.

Norway was the host for the 2010 Women's Bandy World Championship, which was played in Drammen.

See also
Bandy
Rink bandy
Women's Bandy World Championship
Great Britain women's national bandy team
Sweden women's national bandy team
Russia women's national bandy team
Finland women's national bandy team
United States women's national bandy team
Switzerland women's national bandy team
China women's national bandy team
Canada women's national bandy team
Hungary women's national bandy team
Soviet Union women's national bandy team

External links
 http://www.bandyforbundet.no/bandy/

Bandy in Norway
National bandy teams
Bandy